The Journal of Nuclear Medicine is a monthly peer-reviewed medical journal published by Society of Nuclear Medicine and Molecular Imaging that covers research on all aspects of nuclear medicine, including molecular imaging.

Abstracting and indexing
The journal is abstracted and indexed in Science Citation Index, Current Contents/Clinical Medicine, Current Contents/Life Sciences, BIOSIS Previews, and MEDLINE/PubMed. According to the Journal Citation Reports, the journal has a 2020 impact factor of 10.057, ranking it 3rd out of 134 journals in the category "Radiology, Nuclear Medicine & Medical Imaging".

References

External links 
 

Radiology and medical imaging journals
Publications established in 1964
Monthly journals
English-language journals